National Lampoon Book of Books was an American humor book that was published in 1979 in hardcover. It was a spin-off of National Lampoon magazine. It consisted of parodies of best-sellers. The book was edited by Jeff Greenfield, contributors included Gerry Sussman, Danny Abelson, Sean Kelly and Ellis Weiner.

References

 Amazon listing

National Lampoon books
1976 books